Charles Rich may refer to:
 Charles Rich, 4th Earl of Warwick (1619–1673), English peer and member of the House of Lords
 Sir Charles Rich, 3rd Baronet (1680-1706), English naval officer
 Charles Rich (U.S. Representative) (1771–1824), U.S. Representative from Vermont
 Charles A. Rich (1854–1943), American architect
 Charles C. Rich (1809–1883), American leader in The Church of Jesus Christ of Latter-day Saints
 Charlie Rich (1932–1995), American country music musician